The Irish League in season 1957–58 comprised 12 teams, and Ards won the championship.

League standings

Results

References
Northern Ireland - List of final tables (RSSSF)

NIFL Premiership seasons
1957–58 in Northern Ireland association football
North